Jean-Christophe Le Saoût (born 19 July 1975), better known by the stage name Wax Tailor, is a French record producer, DJ and talent manager.
He has released six studio albums collaborating with other artists.

Background
After being a host on French radio in the Paris suburb of Mantes-La-Jolie, Le Saoût started the French rap group La Formule in the 1990s. He created his label Lab'Oratoire in 1998. He began working on the Wax Tailor project in 2001, first appearing on a remix of Looptroop and La Formule's "Deep Under Water".

Releases 
In 2004, JC Le Saoût launched the Wax Tailor concept with an EP, "Lost the Way", that gained the attention of DJ's and music critics in his home country.

In 2005, Wax Tailor released his first album "Tales of the Forgotten Melodies". The album has never left the Electronic Album sales charts on iTunes since its release.

In 2007, Wax Tailor released his second album "Hope & Sorrow" and had his first crossover hit single with "Positively Inclined".

In 2008 in France, he was selected in the Victoires de la musique as "best electronic music album of the year" and won the 7th annual Independent Music Awards Vox Pop vote for best Dance/Electronica album.

In 2009, Wax Tailor came back with "Say Yes", his first single on his new album In the Mood for Life, released on 21 September, featuring with Charlie Winston, Charlotte Savary, Sara Genn, Dionne Charles, A State of Mind, Mattic, Ali Harter, and Speech Defect.

In 2012, after three years of touring around the world, Wax Tailor released "Dusty Rainbow from the Dark", narrated by Don McCorkindale, who voiced the BBC's serialized version of the classic TV show "The Avengers".

In 2014, To celebrate the 10th anniversary of his career, Wax Tailor launched the "Phonovisions Symphonic Orchestra'. Alongside a 35-piece orchestra and a 17-person choir, Wax Tailor embarked on an ambitious re-orchestration of 27 highlights from his 4 albums, to present them in a completely different setting. After a sold-out European tour, the Phonovisions Symphonic Orchestra was chosen to play 3 shows for the re-opening of the prestigious Teatro Colon in Bogota, accompanied by the National Symphonic Orchestra of Colombia.

In 2016, Wax Tailor released his fifth album "By Any Beats Necessary". The title references the Malcolm X phrase "By Any Means Necessary", which was inspired by Sartre's play "Dirty Hands". Wax Tailor invited on this album Ghostface Killah from the Wu Tang Clan, R.A. The Rugged Man, A-F-R-O, Token, Tricky, Lee Fields, Charlotte Savary, Sara Genn, Mattic and Raashan Ahmad and IDIL. 

In 2017, following the release of "By Any Beats Necessary", Wax Tailor went on a long world tour. During this tour, he came up with the idea of having this album remixed. Established producers such as Ollie Teeba (The Herbaliser) or the US duo Du-Rites (J-Zone) as well as a cohort of rising artists such as ProleteR, Soul Square, The Geek x Vrv, Poldoore, Kognitif, Fatbabs, Madwreck, Benji Blow, Le Parasite were selected by Wax Tailor to keep a general musical cohesiveness to the project and bring new life to the original album.

In January 2021, Tailor released "The Shadow of Their Suns", his sixth studio album, featuring guest artists like Mark Lanegan, Del The Funky Homosapien (Gorillaz), D Smoke, Gil Scott Heron, Rosemary Standley (Moriarty), Mr Lif, Adeline, and Yugen Blakrok. Tailor also announced a new international tour which will start in France.

Awards
Winner of 2013 Sacem Electronic Music Prize
Winner of the 7th annual Independent Music Awards Vox Pop vote for best Dance/Electronica album Hope & Sorrow
Three of his albums, Hope & Sorrow, In The Mood for Life and Dusty Rainbow From The Dark were nominated for Best Electronic Album at the Victoires de la Musique in France

Discography

Albums

Live albums

EPs and singles

Remixes
 Looptroop & La Formule - Deep Under Water (Wax Tailor remix) 2001
 Clover - Death of the Lonely Superhero (Wax Tailor remix) 2005
 Wax Tailor - Our Dance (Wax Tailor Remix) 2006 
 Nina Simone - I Am Blessed 2008

Covers, references, and sampling 
 His track "Seize The Day" recorded with Charlotte Savary appears in the soundtrack of the 2008 film Paris by Cédric Klapisch.

References

External links
Official website
Wax Tailor at Discogs
Wax Tailor artist page at Le Plan
Wax Tailor at MusicBrainz
Wax Tailor at Instagram

1975 births
Living people
People from Vernon, Eure
French hip hop musicians